FMIA may refer to:

 Federal Meat Inspection Act, an American law on food safety
 Financial Market Infrastructure Act, Swiss legislation for the regulation of financial markets